A Single Rider is a 2017 South Korean drama film starring Lee Byung-hun and Gong Hyo-jin. The film released on February 22, 2017. Co-produced and distributed  by Warner Bros., the film is the directorial debut of Lee Joo-young.

Plot
Promising fund manager Kang Jae-hoon is at the brink of despair when his company goes bankrupt. He decides to take an impulsive trip to Australia to visit his wife, Soo-jin, and their son Jin-woo. Upon arriving, Jae-hoon sees them living happily without him and starts suspecting Soo-jin's affectionate relationship with her neighbor, Kris. Taken aback by the situation, Jae-hoon decides to watch them from a distance, only to confront a shocking truth that goes against what he stands for.

Cast

Lee Byung-hun as Kang Jae-hoon
Gong Hyo-jin as Lee Soo-jin
Ahn So-hee as Ji-na / Yoo Jin-ah
Jack Campbell as Kris 
Yang Yoo-jin as Kang Jin-woo
Annika Whiteley as Lucy
Kei Ekland as Grandmother 
Baek Soo-jang as In-ho
Choi Joon-young as Javi
Lee Seung-ha as Amy
Leeanna Walsman as Stella 
Benedict Hardie as Mr. Harbour
Kim Hak-sun as Managing Director 
James Wright as Central Station Staff 
John Harding as Australian Policeman 
Dylan Hayes as Australian Policeman 
Celia Kelly as Nurse 
Lea Riley as Audition Staff 
Keith Thomas as Audition Judge Man
Andrew Doyle as Audition Judge Man

Awards and nominations

References

External links
A Single Rider on Internet Movie Database 
A Single Rider on Hancinema

2017 films
South Korean drama films
Films shot in Australia
Warner Bros. films
2010s South Korean films